Czesław Kubiak (25 March 1932 – 11 July 1996) was a Polish field hockey player. He competed in the men's tournament at the 1960 Summer Olympics.

References

External links
 

1932 births
1996 deaths
Polish male field hockey players
Olympic field hockey players of Poland
Field hockey players at the 1960 Summer Olympics
People from Gniezno